Simon Clarke may refer to:

Simon Clarke (footballer) (born 1971), English footballer
Simon Clarke (politician) (born 1984), British Conservative MP
Simon Clarke (cyclist) (born 1986), Australian road and former track cyclist
Simon Clarke (rugby union) (1938–2017), English rugby union player
Simon Clarke of the Clarke baronets
Simon Clarke (sociologist) (born 1946), English sociologist
Sir Simon Haughton Clarke, 9th Baronet (1764–1832), West Indies merchant

See also
Simon Toulson-Clarke, lead singer and founder member of the pop group Red Box
Simon Clark (disambiguation)
Clarke (surname)